Phaniola caboana is a species of moth of the family Tortricidae. It is found in Rio de Janeiro, Brazil.

The wingspan is about 7.5 mm. The ground colour of the forewings is cream, slightly tinged with ochreous grey and with weak brownish-grey suffusions and brownish dots along the dorsum and costa. The markings are greyish brown. The hindwings are pale brownish cream.

Etymology
The species name refers to Arraial do Cabo, the type locality.

References

Moths described in 2007
Cochylini